The 2013–14 FIS Ski Jumping World Cup was the 35th World Cup season in ski jumping for men, the 17th official World Cup season in ski flying and the 3rd World Cup season for ladies. It began on 23 November 2013 in Klingenthal, Germany and ended on 23 March 2014 in Planica, Slovenia. A break took place during the season to accommodate the ski jumping event at the 2014 Winter Olympics in Sochi. From 13 to 16 March 2014, FIS Ski Flying World Championships 2014 took place in Harrachov, Czech Republic.

The defending champions from the previous season were Gregor Schlierenzauer from Austria, who was also the defending ski flying champion, and Sara Takanashi from Japan.

The Four Hills Tournament was won by Thomas Diethart of Austria, who won events in Garmisch-Partenkirchen and Bischofshofen and finished third in Oberstdorf. Before the beginning of the Tournament, Diethart competed at only four World Cup events. Peter Prevc of Slovenia won the Ski Flying Cup with one first and one second place at Kulm flying hill. Due to Planica hill being renovated, the World Cup finals took place at HS139 hill instead of the HS215.

Kamil Stoch of Poland won the men's overall title. Stoch was leading the cup standings for most of the season and managed to secure the title in the second-to-last event in Planica. Stoch also won most events of the season (six), followed by Severin Freund of Germany (five) and Prevc (three). Stoch won his first overall title and the first title for Poland since Adam Małysz in 2006. Prevc became the first Slovenian to finish at the overall podium since Primož Peterka who won the 1996–97 and 1997–98 seasons. Freund became the first German to finish at the podium since Sven Hannawald in 2003.

In women's cup, Sara Takanashi won 15 out of 18 events and secured her second consecutive overall title.

Season titles

Map of world cup hosts 
All 25 locations hosting world cup events for men (20) and ladies (11) in this season. Events in Klingenthal and Ljubno were canceled. 

 Four Hills Tournament

Calendar

Men 

 One-jump competition due to strong wind conditions.

Ladies 

 Originally scheduled in Ljubno, moved to Planica because of lack of snow.

Men's team 

 Final round cancelled due to bad wind conditions.

Mixed

Men's standings 
source:

Overall

Ladies' standings 
source:

Overall

Achievements
First World Cup career victory
, 19, in his 2nd season – the WC 1 in Klingenthal; it also was his first podium
, 22, in his 3rd season – the WC 8 in Engelberg; it also was his first podium
, 21, in his 4th season – the WC 11 in Garmisch-Partenkirchen; first podium was 2013–14 WC 10 in Oberstdorf
, 25, in his 5th season – the WC 12 in Innsbruk; it also was his first podium
, 22, in her 1st season – the WC 5 in Chaykovsky; first podium was 2013–14 WC 2 in Hinterzarten
, 21, in his 5th season – the WC 15 in Bad Mitterndorf; first podium was 2012–13 WC 27 in Planica
, 18, in his 2nd season – the WC 16 in Wisła; first podium was 2012–13 WC 5 in Sochi
, 30, in his 11th season – the WC 22 in Sapporo; first podium was 2006–07 WC 17 in Willingen

First World Cup podium
, 22, in his 2nd season – no. 2 in the WC 2 in Kuusamo
, 14, in her 1st season – no. 2 in the WC 1 in Lillehammer
, 22, in her 1st season – no. 3 in the WC 2 in Hinterzarten
, 19, in her 3rd season – no. 3 in the WC 7 in Hinzenbach
, 21, in his 4th season – no. 3 in the WC 10 in Obersdorf
, 22, in his 5th season – no. 3 in the WC 15 in Wisła

Victory in this World Cup (in brackets victory for all time)
 , 15 (24) first places
 , 6 (13) first places
 , 5 (9) first places
 , 3 (3) first places
 , 2 (52) first places
 , 2 (2) first places
 , 1 (23) first places
 , 1 (21) first places
 , 1 (16) first places
 , 1 (6) first places
 , 1 (4) first places
 , 1 (1) first place
 , 1 (1) first place
 , 1 (1) first place
 , 1 (1) first place
 , 1 (1) first place
 , 1 (1) first place

Retirements 
Following are notable ski-jumpers who announced their retirement:
  – after 12 seasons
  - after 16 seasons
  - after 18 seasons
  - after 14 seasons

References

World cup
World cup
FIS Ski Jumping World Cup